Brendan Hosking is an Australian rules football umpire currently officiating in the Australian Football League.

He first umpired in the Essendon District Football League in 2003. He went on to umpire in the 2010 TAC Cup Grand Final and the 2011 VFL Grand Final. He made his AFL umpiring debut in Round 3, 2012, in a match between Greater Western Sydney and West Coast.

He was appointed the 2022 AFL Grand Final between Geelong Cats and Sydney Swans partnering alongside Matt Stevic - 9 and Simon Meredith - 21.

References

Australian Football League umpires

Living people
Year of birth missing (living people)